H.A.Q.Q. is the fourth studio album by the American band Liturgy. It was released on November 12, 2019 as a surprise digital release, and physically in February 2020 through main artist Hunter Hunt-Hendrix's label YLYLCYN. It was primarily recorded and produced in August 2019.

Background and concept
The press release for H.A.Q.Q. describes the record as "a consolidation of the band's sound to date," as well as "Liturgy’s most vulnerable record for Hunter Hunt-Hendrix, addressing anger and struggles around mental health, sexuality, and religion." The album title is an acronym for "Haelegen above Quality and Quantity". Haelegen is a function within Hunt-Hendrix's belief system, which she previously explored through the record New Introductory Lectures on the System of Transcendental Qabala (2016); this belief system is expressed as a diagram on the cover of the album.

The album is tied to an ongoing series of philosophical lectures by Hunt-Hendrix on YouTube, which details the system of concepts portrayed by the diagram on its cover.

Critical reception 
Pitchfork gave the album a 7.6 out of 10, calling it "their most aggressive and radical album yet." H.A.Q.Q. was ranked #30 of 2019 by fans on Rate Your Music, and Kerrang called it one of the ten best surprise-released rock albums of all time.

Track listing

 All track titles are stylized in all uppercase.

Personnel
Liturgy
 Hunter Hunt-Hendrix – guitar, vocals, electronics, piano , bells , production
 Bernard Gann – guitar
 Tia Vincent-Clark – bass
 Leo Didkovsky – drums, glockenspiel 
Additional personnel
 Marilu Donovan – harp 
 Lucie Vítková – hichiriki 
 Eric Wubbels – piano 
 Adam Robinson – ryuteki 
 Tadlow Ensemble – strings 
 Cory Bracken – vibraphone 
 Charlotte Mundy – voice 
 Matt Colton – mastering
 Seth Manchester – mixing

References

2019 albums
Liturgy (band) albums